On 27 March 1951 a Douglas Dakota 3 cargo aircraft registered G-AJVZ operated by Air Transport Charter en route from Ringway Airport, Manchester, England, to Nutts Corner Airport, Antrim, Northern Ireland, crashed shortly after takeoff following the failure of the aircraft to gain height. There were two fatalities amongst the crew on board.

Accident

The Dakota was operating a flight carrying newspapers from Ringway to Nutts Corner. On takeoff from Runway 06 in freezing conditions and light falling snow, it swung to port, failed to climb, and struck the top of a tree in Woodhouse Lane, close to the hamlet of Heyhead, half a mile from the end of the runway. Both pilots were killed.

Conclusion
The subsequent investigation found that the crash resulted from a loss of engine power caused by ice formation in the carburettor intakes attributable to the captain's failure to make use of the heat controls. The extended undercarriage and the presence of snow on the wings may have also been contributory factors.

References

External links
 Manchester Airport

Aviation accidents and incidents in England
Aviation accidents and incidents in 1951
Air Transport Charter accidents and incidents
Aviation accidents and incidents at Manchester Airport
1951 in England
March 1951 events in the United Kingdom
Accidents and incidents involving the Douglas C-47 Skytrain